Trofeo Princesa Sofia is an annual sailing regatta in Palma de Majorca, Spain.

The 46th edition was held in April and May 2015. It is part of the 2015 EUROSAF Champions Sailing Cup.

Winners

Men's 470

2015 –  Lucas Calabrese & Juan de la Fuente
2016 – 
2017 –  Tetsuya Isozaku & Akira Takayanagi

Women's 470

2015 –  Jo Aleh & Polly Powrie
2016 – 
2017 –  Afrodite Zegers & Anneloes van Veen

Men's 49er

2015 –  Peter Burling & Blair Tuke
2016 – 
2017 –  James Peters & Fynn Sterritt

Women's 49er FX

2015 –  Maiken Focht Schütt & Anne-Julie Schütt
2016 – 
2017 –  Victoria Jurczok & Anika Lorenz

Men's Finn

2015 –  Giles Scott
2016 – 
2017 –  Max Salminen

Men's Formula Kite

2015 –  Florian Trittel

Women's Formula Kite

2015 –  Elena Kalinina

Men's Laser

2015 –  Philipp Buhl
2016 – 
2017 –  Francesco Marrai

Women's Laser Radial

2015 –  Evi Van Acker
2016 – 
2017 –  Zhang Dongshuang

Mixed Nacra 17

2015 –  Billy Besson & Marie Riou
2016 – 
2017 –  Fernando Echavarri & Tara Pacheco

Men's RS:X

2015 –  Kiran Badloe
2016 – 
2017 –  Paweł Tarnowski

Women's RS:X

2015 –  Charline Picon
2016 – 
2017 –  Zofia Noceti-Klepacka

2.4 Metre

2015 –  Helena Lucas

Dragon

2015 –  Marc Patiño, Juan Galmés & Pau Balaguer
2016 – 
2017 –  Lady Tati – Patrick Monteiro de Barros & crew|

J/80

2017 –  Francisco Javier Chacartegui Cirerol & crew

References

Annual sporting events in Spain
Sailing competitions in Spain
Sailing regattas
Recurring sporting events established in 1968
Sailing World Cup
EUROSAF Champions Sailing Cup
1968 establishments in Spain